Harmonium En Tournée is a live album by Harmonium, consisting of a live performance of the studio album L'Heptade, recorded live in Vancouver, 1977. It was released in 1980 by Canadian Broadcasting Corporation/Société Radio-Canada's (SRC) music distribution arm, Les Disques SRC, and CBS Disques. After selling tens of thousands of copies, unauthorised by the band, CBS stopped distribution. After 20 years of being copied exclusively illegally by cassette, a foreign unauthorised CD version started being sold, which prompted the distribution of a legal CD version in 2002.

Track listing

Disc One 
Introduction (1:30)
Comme un fou (7:08)
Chanson noire
Le bien, Le mal (4:22)
Pour une blanche cérémonie (4:10)
Le Premier ciel (20:52)

Disc Two 
L'Exil (11:58)
Le Corridor (3:50)
Lumière de vie
Lumière de nuit (4:17)
Lumière de jour (2:38)
Lumière de vie (0:51)
Lumière de vie (2eme Partie) (3:12)
Lumière de vie (3eme Partie) (4:44)
Lumière de vie (Finale) (2:43)
Comme un sage (15:30)

Track Listing (as shown on original vinyl)

Side A 
Introduction (Fiori) (1:30)
Comme un fou (Fiori-Normandeau) (6:41)
Chanson noire (Fiori-Normandeau-Locat) (8:35)

Side B 
Le Premier ciel (Fiori-Normandeau) (20:18)

Side C 
L'Exil (Fiori) (11:33)
Le Corridor (Fiori-Normandeau) (4:16)
Lumière de vie (1ère partie) (Fiori-Normandeau-Chotem-Locat-Valois) (4:31)

Side D 
Lumière de vie (2ème partie) (Fiori-Normandeau-Chotem-Locat-Valois) (13:21)
Comme un sage (Fiori) (14:55)

Personnel 
 Serge Fiori : Acoustic & Electric guitars, Vocals
 Robert Stanley : Electric guitar
 Louis Valois : Electric Bass, Taurus Moog Bass Pedals, Vocals
 Monique Fauteux : Piano, Fender Rhodes Electric Piano, Vocals
 Libert Subirana : Flute, Saxophone, Clarinet, Vocals
 Serge Locat : Keyboards, Piano, Organ, Mellotron, Mini Moog Synthesizer
 Denis Farmer : Drums, Percussion

References

Harmonium (band) albums
1980 live albums